Michał Chodara (born 17 March 1986) is a Polish handball player for SPR Stal Mielec and the Polish national team.

He participated at the 2013 World Men's Handball Championship.

References

1986 births
Living people
People from Biłgoraj
Polish male handball players
Vive Kielce players